Abiodun Egunjobi commonly known as Godogodo was a Nigerian armed robber.

Life 
Godogodo was a scrap dealer in Gatankowa, Abule-Egba in Lagos, Lagos state. He was arrested by the Nigerian police for causing civil unrest. Due to lack of bail, he spent six years in prison. After he was released from prison, he formed his own gang of criminals to rob. He was known to organize heists against banks and bureaux de change. He was tackled by Umar Manko of the Lagos State Police Command and DCP Abba Kyari who headed the Special Anti-Robbery Squad.
His most significant robbery is said to be the Black Sunday robbery of 9 September 2012, which took the life of two police officers and seven civilians.
He was  arrested on 1 August 2013, in his house in Ibadan.

References 

Bank robbers
Nigerian gangsters
Nigerian people convicted of murder
People convicted of murder by Nigeria